At the 2001 Jeux de la Francophonie, the judo events were held at the Robert Guertin Arena in Gatineau from July 15 to July 17. A total of 14 events were contested according to gender and weight division.

Medal winners

Men

Women

Medal table

References

Sports in Canada
2001 Jeux de la Francophonie
Judo at the Jeux de la Francophonie
Francophone Games
Judo competitions in Canada